D'Qwell Jackson (born September 26, 1983) is a former American football inside linebacker who played eleven seasons in the National Football League (NFL). He played college football at Maryland, and was drafted by the Cleveland Browns in the second round of the 2006 NFL Draft. He has also played for the Indianapolis Colts.

Early years
Jackson attended Seminole High School in Seminole, Florida, where he was a three-year letterwinner and spent time at linebacker, fullback, quarterback and punter.  Jackson made 150 tackles with 16 for loss, four forced fumbles and four fumbles recovered as a junior in 2000, and 91 tackles as a senior, including 10 sacks.  He also rushed for 950 yards with a 5.7-yard average and 13 touchdowns as a fullback.  Jackson was a first-team all-state selection by the Associated Press as a junior and senior.

Considered a three-star recruit by Rivals.com, Jackson was ranked 57th among outside linebacker prospects in the nation.  He chose to attend Maryland over North Carolina State.

College career

In 2002, Jackson saw action in all 14 games and led all freshmen in tackles with 51, including 38 solo stops. As a sophomore, he started all 13 games at middle linebacker and led the team with 136 tackles (90 solo).  He also recorded 7.5 tackles for a loss, 2.5 sacks, two interceptions (one returned for a TD), two pass breakups, 10 QB hurries and one forced fumble.  Jackson earned second-team All-ACC selection honors that year.

Having established himself as the leader of the Terrapin defense, Jackson started all 11 games in 2004 and led the ACC with 123 tackles.  He was named first-team All-America by Collegefootballnews.com and second-team by Rivals.com, also receiving All-American honorable mention by Pro Football Weekly.

Jackson entered his senior year on the preseason "watch list" for the Bednarik, Lombardi, Nagurski and Lott Awards.  He became a three-time All-ACC performer after finishing the season with 137 tackles, 6.5 for loss, four sacks, and two interceptions.  Jackson was also named ACC Defensive Player of the Year, joining E. J. Henderson as the only Terps to earn this honor.

Jackson became only the seventh player in school history to record over 400 tackles in a career.  His 447 tackles rank fourth on Maryland's all-time record list behind linebackers Eric Wilson (481, 1981–84), E. J. Henderson (473, 1999–2002) and Chuck Faucette (466, 1983–86). He also joined Ratcliff Thomas (1993–95) and Henderson (2000–02) as the only Maryland players to lead the team in tackles three consecutive seasons.

Professional career
Jackson was the second highest-rated inside linebacker according to SI′s Tony Pauline, but some were scared off by his slow 40-yard dash. Also, at 6 foot and 228 pounds, he was deemed "more suited for a Cover 2 defensive scheme" and considered as a possible weak-side linebacker. NFL draft analyst Mike Mayock projected Jackson to be a late first round pick.

Cleveland Browns
The Cleveland Browns selected Jackson in the second round (34th overall) of the 2006 NFL Draft. The Browns traded center Jeff Faine and their second round pick (43rd overall) to the New Orleans Saints in exchange for their second round pick (34th overall) that was used to draft Jackson. Jackson was the seventh linebacker drafted in 2006.

On July 23, 2006, the Cleveland Browns signed Jackson to a four-year, $3.69 million contract that includes a signing bonus of $1.90 million. He entered training camp slated as a starting inside linebacker. Head coach Romeo Crennel named Jackson and Andra Davis the starting inside linebackers to start the regular season, alongside outside linebackers Kamerion Wimbley and Willie McGinest.

In his rookie season, he started thirteen games at weakside linebacker and finished third on the team in tackles with 93, including 60 solo and three tackles for a loss.  Jackson posted a career-high 16 tackles at Carolina on October 8, 2006, and matched the total vs. Cincinnati on November 26, 2006.

Playing inside linebacker in his third season with the Browns, Jackson led the NFL in tackles with 154.

Jackson changed his jersey number from No. 58 to No. 52 after it became available in 2008. He had previously worn No. 52 in college, but was unable to wear it during his first two seasons as it was worn by Matt Stewart.

Jackson's 2009 season was cut short after he was injured in the sixth game of the season against Pittsburgh.  Jackson had a team high 57 tackles when he hurt his shoulder.  Browns' coach Eric Mangini said of Jackson at the time, "It’s disappointing any time you lose a player for the season, and this is especially true with someone like D’Qwell, who has proven to be an outstanding leader for us both on and off the field."

On March 5, 2010, the Cleveland Browns extended a one-year restricted free agent tender to Jackson. On June 14, 2010, Jackson signed a one-year, $1.75 million restricted free agent tender to remain with the Browns through 2010.

On March 3, 2011, the Cleveland Browns signed Jackson to a one-year, $4.50 million contract.
Jackson finally returned from injury in 2011 after nearly missing two whole seasons in a row and thrived in the Browns new 4-3 defensive alignment. Where the 3-4 restricted Jackson due to his lack of elite size, the 4-3 gave him more space and room to make a play on the ball-carrier.

On February 26, 2012, the Cleveland Browns signed Jackson to a five-year, $42.50 million contract that includes $19 million guaranteed.

On October 26, 2012, Jackson was fined $7,875 for a late hit against the Indianapolis Colts in Week 7.

On February 26, 2014, the Cleveland Browns released Jackson and saved $5.23 million in salary cap space and avoided paying a $4.10 million roster bonus. As a unrestricted free agent he visited multiple teams, including the Indianapolis Colts, Miami Dolphins, Tennessee Titans, and Denver Broncos.

Indianapolis Colts
Jackson agreed to terms with the Indianapolis Colts on March 6, 2014. He signed a 4-year, $22 million contract, with $11 million guaranteed. He won the AFC Defensive Player of the Week in week 13 of the 2014 season, when he had 12 tackles, 1 pass defended, 1 fumble recovery, and 1 touchdown against the Washington Redskins. On December 23, Jackson was named as an alternate player for the 2014 Pro Bowl.

Jackson caught an interception thrown by Tom Brady in the AFC Championship Game against the New England Patriots; although they would go on to lose the game 45-7, this catch became notorious following the Deflategate incident.

On February 3, 2015, Jackson was arrested for assault after allegedly punching a pizza delivery man in the head in Washington D.C.

Jackson was suspended four games on December 6, 2016 for violating the NFL policy on performance-enhancing substances.

On February 9, 2017, Jackson was released by the Colts.

Career statistics

 AFC Leader

References

External links

Official website 
Cleveland Browns bio 
Maryland Terrapins bio 
Refreshing scenarios heading into camp, Yahoo! Sports, July 24, 2009.

1983 births
Living people
American football linebackers
Cleveland Browns players
Indianapolis Colts players
Maryland Terrapins football players
People from Largo, Florida
Players of American football from Florida
Seminole High School (Pinellas County, Florida) alumni
Sportspeople from Pinellas County, Florida
Unconferenced Pro Bowl players
Ed Block Courage Award recipients